"Paradise" is a pop ballad recorded by the Bee Gees included on the 1981 album Living Eyes. It was later released as a single in Netherlands and Japan with "Nothing Could Be Good" as the B-side. It was included on the 1983 greatest hits album Gold & Diamonds.

Background
It was one of the ballads in the album and to feature the Gibb brothers singing harmony including "Don't Fall in Love with Me" and "I Still Love You". It was written and composed by Barry, Robin and Maurice Gibb. Barry and Maurice on acoustic guitars while Don Felder of Eagles on electric guitar, piano by George Bitzer, synthesizer by Albhy Galuten and drums by Steve Gadd. Barry and Robin Gibb sings lead vocals together.

Personnel
 Barry Gibb — lead vocals, acoustic guitar
 Robin Gibb — lead vocals
 Maurice Gibb — acoustic guitar
 Don Felder — electric guitar
 Albhy Galuten — synthesizer
 Richard Tee — piano
 Harold Cowart — bass
 Steve Gadd — drums
 George Bitzer — piano

References

Bee Gees songs
Songs written by Barry Gibb
Songs written by Robin Gibb
Songs written by Maurice Gibb
Song recordings produced by Barry Gibb
Song recordings produced by Robin Gibb
Song recordings produced by Maurice Gibb
1981 songs
1981 singles
Pop ballads
Song recordings produced by Albhy Galuten